Chester Dewayne Turner (born November 5, 1966) is an American convicted serial killer. On April 30, 2007, he was convicted of the murders of ten women in Los Angeles, and was also found guilty of the death of the unborn child of one of his victims.  He was convicted of four additional murders on June 19, 2014. Prosecutors have called Turner "one of the most prolific serial killers in the city's history".

On July 10, 2007, Turner was sentenced to death for the 11 murders he was originally convicted of committing.  On June 26, 2014, Turner was sentenced to death a second time for the four additional murders.

Early life
Turner was born in Warren, Arkansas. He moved to Los Angeles with his mother when he was five years old after his parents separated. He attended public schools in Los Angeles and dropped out of high school. Working for Domino's Pizza as a cook and delivery person as a young man, he lived with his mother until she moved to Utah. After that, he moved around to different homeless shelters and missions.

Crimes
Turner has been convicted of 11 murders in Los Angeles between 1987 and 1998. The first nine of these murders took place in a four-block-wide corridor that ran on either side of Figueroa Street between Gage Avenue and 108th Street:

 Diane Johnson, 21, found partially nude and strangled in March 1987 in a roadway construction area west of the Harbor Freeway.
 Annette Ernest, 26, daughter of Mildred White, who was friends with Jerri Johnson Tripplett, mother of Turner's fifth victim Andrea Tripplett, was found lying on a shoulder of a road in October 1987, partially nude and strangled. 
 Anita Fishman Breier, 31, strangled and left partially nude outside a garage in an alley off Figueroa Street in January 1989. Her nephew described her as "upbeat, happy". Her sister, Suzanne, was trying to help her through her struggle with addiction.
 Regina Nadine Washington, 27, also found partially nude and strangled inside a garage off Figueroa Street in September 1989. Washington was six months pregnant. The death of the fetus, referred to as Baby Washington, was attributed to the mother's strangulation and was ruled a homicide.
 Andrea Tripplett, 29, strangled, found partially nude behind a vacant building on Figueroa Street in April 1993. She was  months pregnant, but at the time, California law did not consider the fetus viable, so Turner was not charged with its murder.
 Desarae Ellemae Jones, 29, was found strangled in a backyard in May 1993. Her brother Frank described her as "smart, outgoing, and funny" and stated that before succumbing to her addiction, she worked at a rest home for the elderly. 
 Natalie Price, 31, was found partially nude and strangled next to a vacant residence in February 1995.
 Mildred Williams Beasley, 45, was found partially nude and strangled; she was left amongst the bushes alongside the 110 Fwy in November 1996. She was married and had a teenage son.

The last two murders occurred outside of this corridor in Los Angeles County:

 Paula Vance, 24, was found in the Olympia Tool business in Azusa in February 1998. Vance suffered from mental illness and was transient.
 Brenda Bries, 39, was found strangled in a portable toilet near Little Tokyo in April 1998. She was found just 50 yards away from the hotel where Turner was staying.

A bystander witnessed the Vance murder at a neighboring trailer park. Turner was jailed seven times from 1995 to 2002, six for nonviolent offenses and once for an assault charge on an officer and cruelty to an animal on April 9, 1997. In March 2002, Turner sexually assaulted a 47-year-old woman for approximately two hours and threatened to kill her if she told the police. He was convicted and sentenced to eight years at a California state prison.

Turner was required to give a DNA sample to California's Combined DNA Index System (CODIS). In September 2003, based on that sample, Turner was identified as a match for DNA recovered from Vance and Beasley. Detectives then began a careful examination of Turner's background. Nine of the 11 unsolved murders were matched to Turner using DNA evidence.

Additional murder convictions and second death sentence
On June 19, 2014, Turner was convicted of four additional murders. The four victims were identified as Cynthia Annette Johnson, 30; Elandra Joyce Bunn, 33; Mary Edwards, 42; and Deborah Williams, 28. Authorities said that DNA linked Turner to the killings. He received another death sentence for those murders on June 26, 2014.

The California Supreme Court heard an automatic appeal on 2 September 2020 in the case. On November 30, 2020, the California Supreme Court reversed Turner's murder conviction for the unborn baby. However, the death sentence for the other 14 victims was upheld.

Wrongful conviction of previous suspect
During the investigation of these cases, detectives also reviewed similar solved cases. In doing so, the detectives found that David Allen Jones, 28, had been convicted of three murders in the same area where Turner was known to be operating, including Tammie Christmas, found strangled in September 1992 at the 97th Street Elementary School. Jones, a mentally disabled part-time janitor who was barely literate, was questioned without an attorney and admitted using drugs with the victims in the areas where their bodies were found.

Rather than using these convictions as a basis for excluding Turner, the detectives revisited these "solved" murders and re-evaluated the physical evidence. The detectives found that Jones' 1995 trial had relied upon other evidence, including Jones' coerced statements to police, instead of DNA analysis. At the detectives' request, the LAPD Crime Laboratory processed the available evidence using the latest DNA applications. Although DNA analysis could not be used to reinvestigate the Christmas murder, prosecutors and police are confident that Jones is innocent of the Christmas murder and that Turner is the likely culprit.

Jones had also been convicted of a rape unrelated to the murders during his trial. He had served out his sentence for the 2000 rape conviction. The new investigation revealed that the blood typing evidence did not match the blood types found in the crimes for which he spent eleven years in prison, and he was acquitted as a murderer. Jones was released from prison in March 2004 and has filed a lawsuit against the City of Los Angeles (LA). Jones was awarded $720,000 in compensation.

See also 
 Southside Slayer
 List of serial killers in the United States
 List of serial killers by number of victims

References

1966 births
20th-century African-American people
20th-century American criminals
African-American people
American male criminals
American people convicted of murder
American prisoners sentenced to death
American rapists
American serial killers
Criminals from Los Angeles
Living people
Male serial killers
People convicted of murder by California
People from Bradley County, Arkansas
Prisoners sentenced to death by California
Violence against women in the United States